Baphia speciosa is a species of plant in the family Fabaceae. It is found only in Zambia.

References

speciosa
Flora of Zambia
Vulnerable plants
Taxonomy articles created by Polbot